The Husband Hunter is a 1920 British silent drama film directed by Fred W. Durrant and starring C.M. Hallard, Madge Titheradge and Tom Reynolds. It was shot at Isleworth Studios.

Cast
 C. M. Hallard as Sir Robert Chester 
 Madge Titheradge as Lalage Penrose 
 Tom Reynolds as James Ogilvy 
 Minna Grey as Joanna Marsh 
 Reginald Dane as Lord Bayard

References

Bibliography
 Bamford, Kenton. Distorted Images: British National Identity and Film in the 1920s. I.B. Tauris, 1999.
 Harris, Ed. Britain's Forgotten Film Factory: The Story of Isleworth Studios. Amberley Publishing, 2012.
 Low, Rachael. The History of the British Film 1918-1929. George Allen & Unwin, 1971.

External links
 

1920 films
British drama films
British silent feature films
Films directed by Fred W. Durrant
1920 drama films
Films set in England
1920s English-language films
1920s British films
Silent drama films